Major General Spencer Edmund Hollond CB, CMG, DSO (19 March 1874 – 5 February 1950) was a British Army staff officer during the First World War.

Life
He was the second son of John Robert Hollond and attended Harrow School (there becoming friends with Winston Churchill) then Trinity College, Cambridge. He joined the Rifle Brigade as a Second Lieutenant in 1895, rising to Lieutenant in 1897.  He served in the Second Boer War, being mentioned in dispatches, receiving the Queen's South Africa Medal with 4 clasps and being promoted to Captain in 1901. He then served as aide-de-camp to the Duke of Connaught from 1901 to 1904 before being promoted to Major in 1913.

During the First World War he rose to Brigadier General, was mentioned seven times in despatches, won the Distinguished Service Order in 1916 and was a GSO2 on Third Army's staff during the battle of the Somme and the battle of Gommecourt, criticising Thomas D'Oyly Snow's planning of the attack and asking Allenby for Snow's dismissal.  He ended the War as BGGS Inspector-General of Training and with the nickname 'Tom' Hollond from his troops.  After the war he was made a colonel (1920), a knight of the Legion of Honour, a Companion of the Order of St Michael and St George in 1919 and a Companion of the Order of the Bath in 1920 and attended the opening of Plymouth's War Memorial in 1923 . He was colonel commandant of 8th Infantry Brigade (1921–1925), commandant of the Senior Officers School (1925–27).  He rose to Major-General in 1927 and retired the following year.

Marriage and issue
He first married on 5 October 1905 to Lulu Pfizer (granddaughter of the American pharmaceutical manufacturer Charles Pfizer) at St George's, Hanover Square. Three of the bridesmaids were English, and three American, and the couple received as wedding gifts a loving cup from the Duke and Duchess of Connaught and Swedish enamels from Princess Gustav of Sweden.  They had one child, Charles Arthur Spencer Hollond (1906–1929). Lulu Pfizer Hollond had been painted in 1901 by the Swiss-born American artist Adolfo Müller-Ury and exhibited that year at Knoedler's in New York.

Lulu died in 1911 and then Spencer remarried on 16 September 1920 to Esther Eliza Sanderson, daughter of Llewellyn Traherne Bassett Sanderson and Lady Rachel Mary Scott.  They had one child, Robert Gustof Percy Hollond, in 1921.

References

External links
Centre for First World War Studies
Letter of thanks for a tank dossier from Hollond to Maj Gen John Frederick Charles Fuller
Biography, drawn from Burke, L.G., 1939; Univ. War List; Army Lists; The V.C. and D.S.O.; Who's Who
thePeerage.com
Plantagenet Roll of the Blood Royal

1874 births
1950 deaths
Alumni of Trinity College, Cambridge
British Army personnel of the Second Boer War
British Army generals of World War I
Companions of the Distinguished Service Order
Companions of the Order of St Michael and St George
Companions of the Order of the Bath
People educated at Harrow School
Rifle Brigade officers
Chevaliers of the Légion d'honneur